University City–Big Bend is a St. Louis MetroLink subway station.  It serves the western portion of Washington University's main campus and the southern portion of University City, Missouri.  Located at the intersection of Big Bend Boulevard and Forest Park Parkway, this station primarily serves passengers arriving on foot from the nearby university and surrounding neighborhoods.

The station's entrances are clad in brick that matches neighboring buildings on Washington University's campus.

Station layout
The station has an entrance at each corner of the intersection of Forest Park Parkway and Big Bend Boulevard, with an elevator at the northwest entrance, stairs at the southwest entrance, and ramps at the two eastern entrances.

References

External links
 St. Louis Metro

MetroLink stations in St. Louis County, Missouri
Blue Line (St. Louis MetroLink)
Railway stations located underground in Missouri
Railway stations in Missouri at university and college campuses
Railway stations in the United States opened in 2006